This article is a comparison of issue tracking systems that are notable, including bug tracking systems, help desk and service desk issue tracking systems, as well as asset management systems. The comparison includes client-server application, distributed and hosted systems.

General 

Systems listed on a light purple background are no longer in active development.

Features

Input interfaces

Notification interfaces

Revision control system integration

Authentication methods

Containers

See also 
 Comparison of help desk issue tracking software
 List of personal information managers
 Comparison of project management software
 Networked Help Desk
 OSS through Java

Notes

References

External links 
 

Issue tracking systems